Tebb is an English surname. Notable people with the surname include:

 Barry Tebb (born 1942), English poet, publisher, and author
 Tommy Tebb (1911–1957), English footballer
 William Tebb (1830–1917), British businessman and reformer

English-language surnames